The following is a timeline of the history of the city of Lille, France.

Prior to 17th century

 1030 - Baldwin IV, Count of Flanders "surrounded a little town with walls".
 1213 - Town besieged by forces of Philip II of France.
 1236 - Hospice Comtesse built.
 1297 - Town besieged by forces of Philip IV of France.
 1304 - French in power.
 1369 - Louis II, Count of Flanders in power.
 1390 - Public clock installed (approximate date).
 1430 - Hotel de Ville built.
 1445 - Population: 25,000.
 1454 - Feast of the Pheasant.
 1459 - Noble Tower built.
 1460s -  founded.
 1473 -  built.
 1531 - Lille customary laws codified (approximate date).
 1535 - Latin school established.
 1592 - Municipal college established.

17th-18th centuries
 1605 - Military hospital founded.
 1617 -  (gate) constructed.
 1622 -  (gate) constructed.
 1667 - Siege of Lille.
 1668
 Lille becomes part of France.
 Town fortified by Sébastien Le Prestre de Vauban.
 1670 - Citadel constructed.
 1675 -  construction begins.
 1692 -  (gate) constructed.
 1701
 Pont-Neuf built.
  construction begins.
 1708 - Siege of Lille.
 1717 - Grand' Garde built.
 1748 - Church of Saint-Étienne built.
 1785 - Opera house built.
 1790
 Lille becomes part of the Nord souveraineté.
 Municipal elections begin.
 Public library founded.
 1792 - City besieged by Austrian forces.
 1793 - Population: 66,761.

19th century
 1802 -  founded.
 1809 - Art museum opens.
 1822 - Natural history museum founded.
 1837 - Palais de Justice built. 
 1839 - Commission historique du Nord founded.
 1842 - Lille-Flandres station opened as the Gare de Lille.
 1844 - Column of the Goddess erected.
 1846 - Paris-Lille railway built.
 1852 - Lycée impérial re-built
 1854 - Faculty of sciences and École des arts industriels et des mines (École centrale de Lille) established.
 1855 - Notre Dame Cathedral construction begins.
 1856 - Population: 78,641.
 1858 - Esquermes, Fives, and Wazemmes become part of Lille.
 1860 - Christ Church, Lille proposed.
 1861 - Population: 131,727.
 1866 - Population: 154,749.
 1870 - Prefecture built.
 1872 - Institut industriel du Nord established ; Saint-Maurice church restored.
 1875 - Catholic University established.
 1876 - Population: 162,775.
 1878 -  built.
 1880 - Société de géographie de Lille founded.
 1886 - Population: 188,272.
 1888 - Musee Commercial et Colonial opens.
 1892
 Palais des Beaux-Arts built.
 Gare de Lille Flandres (rail station) rebuilt.
 1894 - Institut de chimie founded.
 1896 - Population: 216,276.
 1899 - Institut Pasteur established.

20th century

1900-1940s

 1906 - Population: 205,602.
 1909 - Tramway begins operating.
 1911 - Population: 217,807.
 1913
 Roman Catholic diocese of Lille established.
 Opéra de Lille built.
 1914 - German occupation begins (World War I).
 1918 - October 17: City liberated by British.
 1924 - Ecole Supérieure de Journalisme founded.
 1925 - Roger Salengro elected mayor.
 1932 - Hôtel de ville de Lille (City Hall) built.
 1938 - City co-hosts the 1938 FIFA World Cup.
 1940
 May: Siege of Lille.
 German occupation begins (see also: Lille during World War II).
 August: Frontstalag 186 prisoner-of-war camp established by the Germans.
 October: Frontstalag 102 prisoner-of-war camp established by the Germans.
 December: Frontstalag 102 POW camp relocated to Amiens.
 1941
 March: Frontstalag 186 POW camp dissolved.
 April: Echo du Nord begins publication.
 1944
 September - City liberated by Allied forces.
 Lille Olympique Sporting Club formed.
 1947 - Lille Airport in operation.
 1948 - Jardin des Plantes de Lille established.

1950s-1990s
 1967 - Urban Community of Lille Métropole formed.
 1968 -  built.
 1970 - Lille 2 University of Health and Law and Jardin botanique de la Faculté de Pharmacie established.
 1973 - Pierre Mauroy becomes mayor.
 1976 - Orchestre national de Lille formed.
 1977 - Hellemmes becomes an associated part of Lille.
 1981 - City hosts the 1981 European Weightlifting Championships.

 1983 - Lille Metro begins operating.
 1984 - École de communication visuelle opens.
 1987 - Socialist Party national congress held in Lille.
 1986 - Lille Marathon begins.
 1988 - Advanced European Institute of Management established.
 1989 - Transpole formed.
 1990 - École Nouvelle d'Ingénieurs en Communication founded.
 1991 - Institut d'études politiques de Lille established.
 1992 - Institut Lillois d'Ingénierie de la Santé founded.
 1993
 Paris-Lille TGV train begins operating.
 Lille-Europe station built.
 1994
  opens.
 Eurostar train begins operating.
 1999
 Lille Cathedral built.
 Population: 184,657.
 2000 - Lomme becomes an associated part of Lille.

21st century

 2001
 March:  held.
 Martine Aubry becomes mayor.
 2003 - Institut technologique européen d'entrepreneuriat et de management established.
 2004 - Lille designated a European Capital of Culture.
 2006 - Population: 226,014.
 2009 - Université Lille Nord de France formed.
 2011 - Population: 227,533.
 2013 - City co-hosts the EuroBasket Women 2013.
 2014 - March:  held.
 2015
 September: City co-hosts the EuroBasket 2015.
 December: 2015 Nord-Pas-de-Calais-Picardie regional election held.
 2016 - Lille becomes part of the Hauts-de-France region.
 2021 - The historic Saint-Joseph Chapel of Saint-Paul College is controversially demolished.

See also
 Lille history
 
 
 
  region

Other cities in the Hauts-de-France region:
 Timeline of Amiens
 Timeline of Roubaix

References

This article incorporates information from the French Wikipedia.

Bibliography

in English

in French
  (fireworks); also via British Library

External links

 Items related to Lille, various dates (via Europeana).
 Items related to Lille, various dates (via Digital Public Library of America).

Lille